Events from the year 1637 in Ireland.

Incumbent
Monarch: Charles I

Events
February – Mícheál Ó Cléirigh seeks approbation for the text of the Annals of the Four Masters from Thomas Fleming, Archbishop of Dublin (Roman Catholic), before carrying the manuscript to Leuven.
May 25 – letters patent authorise 'Laudian statutes' for Trinity College Dublin.
July 25 – Christopher Wandesford acquires an estate at Castlecomer, County Kilkenny.
August 10 – Edward King is drowned in the Irish Sea en route to visiting his family in Ireland, an event which inspires fellow poet Milton's elegy Lycidas.
December 22 – a charter incorporates the guild of goldsmiths in Dublin and the Dublin Assay Office is established.

Births
Sir Stephen Rice, lawyer (d. 1715)
Approximate date – Richard Head, writer and bookseller (d. c.1686)

Deaths
August 10 – Edward King, poet (b. 1612)
Sir Nathaniel Catelyn, lawyer and politician (b. c.1580)

References

 
1630s in Ireland
Ireland
Years of the 17th century in Ireland